South Woodbury may refer to:

South Woodbury, Ohio
South Woodbury Township, Bedford County, Pennsylvania